Althiomycin (matamycin) is a thiazole antibiotic, effective against Gram-positive and Gram-negative bacteria. The name matamycin is from "Mata Hari" and the suffix .

Isolated from Streptomyces matensis, the compound was first described by Margalith et al. in 1959. It acts a protein synthesis inhibitor and its site of action is the 50S subunit of the bacterial ribosome.

References

Antibiotics
Thiazoles